Bas van Dooren (born 25 August 1973 in Oss) is a Dutch mountain biker. He competed in the Men's cross-country at the 2000 Summer Olympics, finishing 11th. In 1998 he finished second in the cross-country at the European Mountain Bike Championships. In 2000 he finished second overall of the 2000 UCI Mountain Bike World Cup

Van Dooren tested positive for EPO in 2002 from a test two days before the 2002 UCI Mountain Bike & Trials World Championships, where he finished 11th. He bought it in Germany via internet and replied that 'it was a gamble'. He was suspended for one year and ended his career.

See also
 List of Dutch Olympic cyclists

References

1973 births
Living people
Dutch mountain bikers
Dutch male cyclists
Olympic cyclists of the Netherlands
Cyclists at the 2000 Summer Olympics
Sportspeople from Oss
Cyclists from North Brabant